Garstad Church is a parish church of the Church of Norway in the municipality of Nærøysund in Trøndelag county, Norway. It is located in the village of Garstad on the island of Mellom-Vikna. It is the main church for the Vikna parish which is part of the Namdal prosti (deanery) in the Diocese of Nidaros. The white, wooden church was built in a long church style in 1856. The church seats about 320 people.

History
The first church was built at Garstad in Vikna in 1592, being consecrated on 1 November 1592. The church served the Vikna area for over 200 years before it burned to the ground after being struck by lightning on 20 January 1854. Soon after, the church was rebuilt on the same site. The new building was consecrated on 4 July 1856. In the 1950s, the architect Arne Sørvik was hired to lead an extensive restoration of the building prior to its 100th anniversary. The newly updated church was re-consecrated on 16 May 1954. The restoration included new windows, a newly rebuilt tower, and a newly redecorated interior.

See also
List of churches in Nidaros

References

Nærøysund
Churches in Trøndelag
Long churches in Norway
Wooden churches in Norway
19th-century Church of Norway church buildings
Churches completed in 1856
16th-century establishments in Norway